Lemuel Kelley Washburn (1846–1927) was an American Freethought writer. 

He was the compiler of Cosmian Hymn Book: A Collection of Original and Selected Hymns (1888), promoted as "perfectly free from all sectarianism." 

He published various atheist articles and was an editor for the Boston Investigator.

Publications

America's Debt to Thomas Paine (Boston, 1878)
Cosmian Hymn Book (Boston, 1888)
Is the Bible Worth Reading, and Other Essays (Truth Seeker Company, 1911)
The Miracles of Jesus: and Other Essays (Truth Seeker Company, 1917)

References

External links
 

1846 births
1927 deaths
American atheists
Freethought writers